The 336th Independent Guards Bialystok Orders of Suvorov and Alexander Nevsky Naval Infantry Brigade (Military Unit Number 06017) is a brigade of the Russian Naval Infantry, formerly part of the Soviet Naval Infantry.

History

World War II 
The 336th Guards Naval Infantry Brigade traces its history back to the creation of the 347th Rifle Regiment of the 308th Rifle Division (2nd formation) (308th RD (II)), which was formed on March 28, 1942, from a cadre provided by the Omsk Infantry School.

The personnel of the regiment was mainly recruited from military men of the military school, residents of the Omsk Region, Altai Territory and Gorny Altai.

At the end of May 1942, the 308th Rifle Division was redeployed to the Volga Military District near the city of Saratov. On August 19, 1942, the division marched to the front and, by September 10, 1942, advanced to the front line and entered into battle with the opponents of the 24th Army, Stalingrad Front, in the area of the Kotluban state farm (to the north-west of Stalingrad).

In the face of the German onslaught, the 308th retreated into Stalingrad on October 2, 1942, and was re-subordinated to the 62nd Army. The combat positions of the division were in the area of the Barrikady Factory. On November 3, 1942, the 308th RD transferred the defense of the plant to units of the 138th Rifle Division and was withdrawn to the rear.

For its actions at Stalingrad between September and December 1942, the 308th Rifle Division was awarded the Order of the Red Banner by an order dated 19 June 1943. Reassigned to the Volga Military District to be rebuilt, the division spent the next several months reconstituting its strength.  By 1 March 1943, the division was shipped back to the front and assigned to the Kalinin Front reserves and then to the 11th Army in the Reserve of the Supreme High Command.

The division went back to the front in the 3rd Army of the Bryansk Front in Operation Kutuzov.  Distinguishing itself in combat, the division was awarded Guards status and redesignated the 120th Guards Rifle Division. As a result, the regiment was redesignated as the 336th Guards Rifle Regiment. During the remainder of 1943 the division participated in the Orel, Bryansk, and Gomel–Rechitsa operations.

Postwar 

After the end of the war, the regiment was relocated to Minsk with the division later in 1945. In 1957, it was converted into the 336th Guards Motor Rifle Regiment when the division became a motor rifle unit. As a result of its performance in exercises, the 336th was chosen to be converted into a specialized naval infantry unit after the Naval Infantry reformed. In accordance with a directive of 7 June 1963, the regiment was ordered converted into the 336th Separate Guards Naval Infantry Regiment in July; it was to be stationed at Baltiysk, Kaliningrad Oblast.

Fielding 1,519 men in peacetime, its structure was not changed when it transferred to the Naval Infantry and it was instead reequipped. The 336th consisted of three battalions of Naval Infantry equipped with the amphibious BTR armored personnel carrier, a tank battalion with two companies of PT-76 amphibious light tanks and a company of T-55 main battle tanks. Artillery support was provided by a battery of BM-21 Grad multiple rocket launchers and a battery of anti-tank guided missiles, while air defense consisted of a platoon of ZSU-23-4 Shilka anti-aircraft guns and a platoon of 9K31 Strela-1 surface-to-air missiles. Support units included support, reconnaissance, engineer, and NBC defense battalions. The conversion took place at Uruchcha, and was completed in June, when the regiment deployed to Baltiysk in echelons.

On 20 November 1979 the regiment was renamed the 336th independent Guards Naval Infantry Brigade.

The 336th IGNIB has been since 1967 the principal unit of the NI that has taken part in national parades in Red Square of Moscow.

2022 Russian invasion of Ukraine 

The Ukrainian General Staff reported that Russia deployed a battalion tactical group of the 336th Independent Guards Naval Infantry Brigade to “the Crimean direction” on March 10, 2022. On November 5, the brigade was awarded the Order of Zhukov.

Units in the 1980s and 1990s

Brigade Headquarters
 877th Naval Infantry Battalion
 878th Naval Infantry Battalion
 879th Naval (Air Landing) Infantry Battalion
 884th Naval Infantry Battalion
 112th Tank Battalion
 887th Reconnaissance Battalion
 1612th Artillery Battalion
 1618th Anti-Aircraft Missile Battalion
 1615th Multi-Rocket Launcher Artillery Battalion
 1621st Anti-Tank Artillery Battalion

References

Further reading
 

Naval infantry brigades of Russia
Brigades of the Soviet Union
Military units and formations established in 1963